Sir Edmund Cradock-Hartopp, 1st Baronet (21 April 1749 – 10 June 1833) was a British baronet and politician.

Life
Born Edmund Bunney, he was the son of Joseph Bunney and Mary Cradock in Freathby, Leicestershire.

He married in 1777, Anne, the daughter of Joseph Hurlock, Governor of Bencoolen and one of the Directors of the East India Company. Her mother was Anne, daughter of Sir John Hartopp, last of the Hartopp baronets. Upon his marriage, Edmund Bunney changed his name to Cradock-Hartopp, as required by the wills of his maternal uncle Joseph Cradock and his wife's maternal grandfather.

He was High Sheriff of Leicestershire for 1781 and Member of Parliament for Leicestershire between 1798 and 1806. In 1792 he acquired Four Oaks Hall, Sutton Coldfield, the town of which he was briefly Warden in 1823. He was awarded the Cradock-Hartopp baronetcy in 1796.

He died in Bristol in 1833 and was succeeded by his eldest surviving son Edmund.

Notes

References
Kidd, Charles, Williamson, David (editors). Debrett's Peerage and Baronetage (1990 edition). New York: St Martin's Press, 1990,

External links 
 

1749 births
Baronets in the Baronetage of Great Britain
Members of the Parliament of Great Britain for Leicestershire
British MPs 1796–1800
Members of the Parliament of the United Kingdom for Leicestershire
UK MPs 1801–1802
UK MPs 1802–1806
High Sheriffs of Leicestershire
1833 deaths